Electroneutral sodium bicarbonate exchanger 1 is a protein that in humans is encoded by the SLC4A8 gene.

See also 
 Solute carrier family
 cotransporter

Interactions 

SLC4A8 has been shown to interact with Sodium-hydrogen antiporter 3 regulator 1 and Cystic fibrosis transmembrane conductance regulator.

References

Further reading 

 
 
 
 
 
 
 
 
 
 
 

Solute carrier family